Michael Thomas Pinder (born 27 December 1941) is an English musician. He is a founding member and the original keyboard player of the rock group the Moody Blues. He left the group following the recording of the band's ninth album Octave in 1978. He is especially noted for his technological contribution to music.
In 2018, Pinder was inducted into the Rock and Roll Hall of Fame as a member of the Moody Blues.

The Moody Blues

Early years

Pinder was born in Erdington, Birmingham. With Thomas and members of other successful Birmingham bands (singer/guitarist Denny Laine, singer/bassist Clint Warwick and drummer Graeme Edge) formed The Moody Blues in 1964. Their initial single, "Steal Your Heart Away" on Decca, failed to chart. Their second release, "Go Now" however became UK No.1 in January 1965. The band went on to have a further UK hit with "I Don't Want To Go On Without You" and then released their first album The Magnificent Moodies (Decca) in mono only, on which Pinder took the lead vocal on a cover of James Brown's "I Don't Mind". "Bye Bye Bird" from this album was also a big hit for the band in France. The album was released in the USA, retitled as Go Now on London Records.

Pinder and guitarist/lead vocalist Laine began songwriting for the band, providing most B-sides over the 1965–66 period, including "You Don't (All The Time)", "And My Baby's Gone", "This Is My House (But Nobody Calls)" and "He Can Win". They progressed to writing A-sides, including the UK chart hits "Everyday", "From The Bottom of My Heart" (both 1965), "Boulevard De La Madeline" (1966), and "Life's Not Life" (issued in January 1967 but recorded much earlier in 1966), before bassist/vocalist Warwick and then frontman Laine left the group.

A rare non-UK Pinder–Laine song from this era was "People Gotta Go", released on the France-only EP Boulevard De La Madeline and later included as a bonus track on a CD release of The Magnificent Moodies in 2006. The song is also known as "Send the People Away".

'Core seven' period
Pinder was instrumental in the selection of young Swindon guitarist/vocalist/songwriter Justin Hayward as Laine's replacement. It was Pinder who phoned Hayward and then collected him at the railway station. Old friend John Lodge from the El Riot days came in to replace the temporary Rod Clarke as permanent bassist/vocalist, thus completing the 'classic' Moodies line-up.

After an initial abortive attempt to continue with R&B material, the band decided to drop all covers and record only original songs. Pinder and Hayward led the way: Hayward's "Fly Me High" was the first release from the revised line-up, released on Decca in early 1967 with Pinder's older-style rocker "Really Haven't Got The Time" as the B-side.

A recorded but unreleased Pinder song from this time (1967) was the jazz-blues ballad "Please Think About It", which would later be included on the Caught Live + 5 double album issued by Decca in 1977.

Pinder obtained a secondhand Mellotron from Streetly and, after removing all the special effects tapes (train whistles, cock crowing, etc.) and then doubling up the string section tapes, used it on numerous Moody Blues recordings. This began with their single "Love and Beauty", a flower power song written and sung by Pinder, and his only Moodies A-side after 1966. Pinder introduced the Mellotron to his friend John Lennon. The Beatles subsequently used the instrument on "Strawberry Fields Forever".

Pinder's "Dawn (Is A Feeling)" – with lead vocals by Hayward, and Pinder singing the bridge section – began the Days of Future Passed album, on which Pinder also contributed "The Sun Set" and narrated drummer Edge's opening and closing poems, "Morning Glory" and "Late Lament".

Pinder, along with Moodies recording engineer Derek Varnals and longtime producer Tony Clarke (a Decca staff producer assigned to them from "Fly Me High" onwards) managed to devise an innovative way of playing and recording the unwieldy Mellotron to make the sound flow in symphonic waves, as opposed to the sharp cutoff the instrument normally gave. This symphonic sound would characterise most of what later were seen as the Moodies' seven major albums between 1967 and 1972.
 
Pinder was one of the first musicians to use the Mellotron in live performance, relying on the mechanical skills he had gained from his time with Streetly to keep the reportedly unreliable instrument in working order. Typical of his travails was the Moodies' first US concert. When the band struck their first harmony, the back of the Mellotron fell open and all of the tape strips cascaded out. Pinder grabbed his tool box and got the instrument back into working order in 20 minutes' time, while the light crew entertained the audience by projecting cartoons.

In addition to the mellotron, organ and piano, Pinder also played harpsichord, Moog synthesizer, tablas, various forms of keyboards and percussion, autoharp, tambura, cello, bass and both acoustic and electric guitars on Moody Blues recordings from 1967 onwards, as well as providing key vocal harmonies and lead vocals from 1964 to 1978. Pinder also acted as the group's main musical arranger up to 1978.

The 1969 concert on the Caught Live + 5 album and the Live at the Isle of Wight Festival 1970 DVD show Pinder and Thomas acting as the group's onstage spokesmen.

Pinder wrote and sang several of the Moodies' more progressive, even mystic numbers, including "(Thinking is) The Best Way To Travel" and "Om" (both from 1968's In Search of the Lost Chord), plus the innovative symphonic rock piece "Have You Heard/The Voyage/Have You Heard (part two)" which concluded their 1969 album On the Threshold of a Dream. Parts of this track later featured on the Loving Awareness jingles on Radio Caroline during the 1970s. Pinder also continued to narrate Edge's poems, notably "The Word" (1968); "In The Beginning" (with Edge himself and Hayward) and "The Dream" (both 1969); and "The Balance" (1970).

On Edge's "Higher And Higher" (1969), Pinder's Mellotron simulated the sound of a rocket blasting off to open the To Our Children's Children's Children album, to which he wrote and sang "Sun is Still Shining" and a rare co-written song (with John Lodge), "Out and In", on which he also sang lead vocals. Pinder's Mellotron stands out particularly on tracks such as Edge's instrumental "Beyond" and the Hayward–Thomas closing track "Watching And Waiting".

Pinder's earlier non-album song "A Simple Game" (1968), for which he won an Ivor Novello Award, was used as the B-side of their UK hit single "Ride My See Saw" from the "In Search of the Lost Chord" album on Deram; both this song and Pinder's  On The Threshold of A Dream song "So Deep Within You" (1969) were both later successfully covered by The Four Tops.

On 12 October 1968, The Moodies had also cut a then unissued version of "A Simple Game", featuring Hayward on lead vocal, considering the song as a potential UK single which never materialised. The version sung by Pinder was used instead. The rare 'Hayward' version later appeared as a bonus track on the remastered CD version of In Search of the Lost Chord, issued in 2006.

Pinder's 1970 album track "Melancholy Man" (from A Question of Balance) became a No.1 hit as an overseas single in France that year. Pinder's "How is it (We Are Here)" was his other song contribution (a working title; "Mike's Number One" from the album sessions has since surfaced as a later CD release). All three songs had him singing lead vocals, as was usually the case with his compositions.

Pinder's composition and lead vocal "My Song", a deep, reflective atmospheric item, concluded the Moodies' 1971 album Every Good Boy Deserves Favour, on which he also took co-credit with the entire band for the unusual opening track "Procession" (an attempt aurally to depict the evolution of vocal and musical harmony through time). He also sang a featured co-lead vocal and solo spot along with Hayward, Lodge and Thomas on Edge's song "After You Came".

Also in 1971, Pinder guested on John Lennon's Imagine album on the songs "I Don't Wanna Be A Soldier (I Don't Wanna Die)" and "Jealous Guy", playing tambourine rather than the mellotron he intended to play, because by Pinder's account the tapes in Lennon's mellotron looked like "a bowl of spaghetti".

In 1972, the Moodies, then at the height of their popularity, retreated to Mike Pinder's home studio to record Seventh Sojourn, which included two Pinder-penned and -sung contributions: "Lost in a Lost World", and "When You're A Free Man", dedicated to Timothy Leary. However, Pinder switched to the similar-sounding but less-troublesome Chamberlin for this album.

Band hiatus
The Moody Blues took a break from recording in 1974, and Pinder relocated to California, releasing a solo album The Promise in 1976 through the Moodies' Threshold label.

Band reformation, Octave and departure
In 1977, the band returned to recording and performing; Pinder declined full participation, although he collaborated on the 1978 release Octave by recording an unused Promise-era song "One Step Into the Light" with the band. He also added some synthesizer and backing vocals to the album, notably the album intro to Lodge's "Steppin' in a Slide Zone" and the instrumental climax on Edge's "I'll Be Level with You"; he then stopped coming to the sessions when interpersonal conflicts (mostly with Edge) arose. During this time, Pinder was also in a new relationship resulting in marriage and children, thus he preferred not to tour with the band at the time. As a result, the band hired Swiss keyboardist Patrick Moraz, formerly of Yes, in his place.

Post-Moodies life
Pinder took employment as a consultant to the Atari computer corporation (primarily working on music synthesis), remarried, and started a family in Grass Valley, California.  He remained out of the public eye until the mid-1990s, when he began to grant interviews and work on new recording projects. The year 1994 saw the release of his second solo album, Among the Stars, on his own One Step label, to limited success. Another One Step release, A Planet With One Mind (1995), capitalised on Pinder's experience as chief reciter of Graeme Edge's poetry on the Moody Blues albums; in this recording, Pinder reads seven children's stories from different world cultures, accompanied by appropriate world music. As his first spoken word album, it was well received among its contemporaries in the genre – it was a finalist for the Benjamin Franklin Award for Excellence in Audio as an outstanding children's recording.

Pinder has continued to work in the studio on his own and others' projects, and in developing new artists and nurturing the creative process.

Pinder was inducted into the Rock and Roll Hall of Fame, as a member of The Moody Blues, in April 2018.

Family and personal life
Pinder's first marriage was to Donna Roth, with whom he had his eldest son Daniel, but the marriage ended in divorce. Pinder then married an American, Tara Lee, with whom he had two sons Matt and Michael Lee. All three of his sons are musicians: his eldest, Daniel, is a film music editor and consultant, with many credits, including Pirates of the Caribbean: The Curse of the Black Pearl and The Da Vinci Code. Matt and Michael Lee perform as The Pinder Brothers. They have two CDs, Jupiter Falls and Ordinary Man.  Several songs from both albums can be heard on their website and their Myspace page. Mike Pinder plays his trademark Mellotron on some of the songs.

In 2013, Justin Hayward spoke of Pinder's learning Transcendental Meditation in 1967, along with other members of the Moody Blues.

Solo discography
 The Promise (1976)
 Among the Stars (1994)

Compositions
 1965: "Let Me Go" (with Denny Laine) from The Magnificent Moodies
 1965: "Stop!" (with Denny Laine) from The Magnificent Moodies
 1965: "True Story" (with Denny Laine) from The Magnificent Moodies
 1965: "Thank You Baby" (with Denny Laine) from The Magnificent Moodies
 1966: "Boulevard de la Madalaine" (with Denny Laine) from Boulevard de la Madalaine
 1966: "This is My House (But Nobody Calls)" (with Denny Laine) from Boulevard de la Madalaine
 1967: "Life's Not Life" (with Denny Laine) from Boulevard de la Madalaine
 1967: "Love and Beauty" (A-side single)
 1967: "I Really Haven't Got the Time" (single B-side)
 1967: "Dawn is a Feeling" from Days of Future Passed
 1967: "The Sunset" from Days of Future Passed
 1968: "The Best Way to Travel" from In Search of the Lost Chord
 1968: "Om" from In Search of the Lost Chord
 1968: "A Simple Game" (B-side)
 1969: "So Deep Within You" from On the Threshold of a Dream
 1969: "Have You Heard" from On the Threshold of a Dream
 1969: "The Voyage" from On the Threshold of a Dream
 1969: "Out and In" (with John Lodge) from To Our Children's Children's Children
 1969: "Sun Is Still Shining" from To Our Children's Children's Children
 1970: "How is it (We are Here?)" from A Question of Balance
 1970: "Melancholy Man" from A Question of Balance
 1970: "Mike's Number One" outtake from the sessions for A Question of Balance
 1971: "Procession" (with John Lodge, Justin Hayward, Ray Thomas and Graeme Edge) from Every Good Boy Deserves Favour
 1971: "My Song" from Every Good Boy Deserves Favour
 1972: "Lost in a Lost World" from Seventh Sojourn
 1972: "When You're a Free Man" from Seventh Sojourn
 1978: "One Step into the Light" from Octave

References

External links

Songwars – Contest website (includes pictures, etc. of Mike Pinder)

1941 births
Living people
20th-century British pianists
21st-century British pianists
British autoharp players
British Invasion artists
British male pianists
British music arrangers
British rhythm and blues boom musicians
Decca Records artists
English basses
English expatriates in the United States
English male guitarists
English male singer-songwriters
English multi-instrumentalists
English rhythm and blues musicians
English rhythm and blues singers
English rock guitarists
English rock pianists
English rock keyboardists
English rock singers
Ivor Novello Award winners
Musicians from Birmingham, West Midlands
People from Erdington
Progressive rock keyboardists
Rhythm and blues pianists
The Moody Blues members